Goshen Township is one of the twelve townships of Champaign County, Ohio, United States. The 2010 census reported 3,696 people living in the township, 2,052 of whom lived in the unincorporated portions of the township.

Geography
Located in the southeastern corner of the county, it borders the following townships:
Rush Township - north
Union Township, Union County - northeast
Pike Township, Madison County - east
Somerford Township, Madison County - southeast
Pleasant Township, Clark County - south
Union Township - west
Wayne Township - northwest corner

The village of Mechanicsburg is located in the center of the township.

Name and history
It is one of seven Goshen Townships statewide.

Goshen Township was established about 1815 from land given by Union Township.

Government
The township is governed by a three-member board of trustees, who are elected in November of odd-numbered years to a four-year term beginning on the following January 1. Two are elected in the year after the presidential election and one is elected in the year before it. There is also an elected township fiscal officer, who serves a four-year term beginning on April 1 of the year after the election, which is held in November of the year before the presidential election. Vacancies in the fiscal officership or on the board of trustees are filled by the remaining trustees.

References

External links
County website
County and township map of Ohio

Townships in Champaign County, Ohio
Townships in Ohio